The Paag is a headdress in the Mithila region of India and Nepal  worn by Maithil people. It is a symbol of honour and respect and a significant part of Maithil culture.

History and style
The Paag dates back to pre-historic times when it was made of plant leaves. It exists today in a modified form. The Paag is considered as a symbol of pride in Mithila. The colour of the Paag also carries a lot of significance. The red Paag is worn by the bridegroom and by those who are undergoing the sacred thread rituals. Paag of mustard colour is donned by those attending wedding ceremonies and the elders wear a white Paag.

Campaign
A campaign to promote use of the paag was begun in 2016 by Mithilalok, a Mithila cultural pressure group set up in that year. Called Paag Bachau Abhiyan (Save the Paag Campaign), Mithilalok was associated with a proposed symbolic wearing of the garment by some representatives in the Bihar Legislative Council in August 2016, and also with a move to have it recognised as an official head-dress of the state of Bihar.

Darbhanga MP Gopal Jee Thakur had started and popularised the tradition of honouring people with Mithila Paag in the Indian Politics.

Paags designed and developed by Mithilalok are of different shades, colours and shapes considering fitting and suitability.

In order to demonstrate and send across the message of  the Culture of Mithila and India, Paag March is held by Mithilalok  wherein a large number of people take to streets wearing traditional Paag on their heads.

Depiction on a postage stamp
On 10 February 2017, India Posts released a set of sixteen commemorative postage stamps on "Headgears of India". The Mithila Paag was featured on one of those postage stamps.

References

Further reading
http://www.mithilalok.com
http://timesofindia.indiatimes.com/city/patna/Paag-kanwariyas-to-throng-Deoghar-this-Shrawan/articleshow/53198104.cms
http://m.livehindustan.com/news/bihar/article1-kanvarias-will-go-to-devghar-wearing-paag--545359.html
http://m.khabar.ibnlive.com/news/dharm-karm/paag-bachao-abhiyaan-500844.html
http://m.khabar.ibnlive.com/news/city-khabrain/santosh-badal-joins-paag-bachao-abhiyan-501009.html
http://m.livehindustan.com/jmobile/news/bihar/article1-to-save-pag-pag-march-will-be-held--526684.html

 

Culture of Bihar
Mithila
Headgear